Jonathan Dymond (1796–1828) was an English Quaker and an ethical philosopher who is known for his monograph An Enquiry into the Accordancy of War with the Principles of Christianity.

Life
Jonathan Dymond was the son of a Quaker linen-draper of Exeter, County Devon in England. Both his parents were 'Recorded Ministers' of the Society of Friends.  He had little formal education but used his time off from working in his father's shop to read and to write essays on religious and moral problems, as well as composing poetry.  He determined that he should devote his energies to 'the honour of advocating peace'. In his view war was "an evil before which, in my estimation, slavery sinks into insignificance". In 1825 he attended the annual meeting of the Peace Society in London and went on to help set up a branch of that society in Exeter. He soon had to withdraw from taking an active part due to his failing health.

Works
Three works by Dymond have been published, two during his lifetime, the Inquiry and the Observations, and one posthumously, the Essays. A collection of his published and unpublished letters, poems and writings was made in 1911 by Charles William Dymond.
 
 An inquiry into the Accordancy of War with the Principles of Christianity, and an Examination of the Philosophical Reasoning by which it is defended: with Observations on Some of the Causes of War and Some of Its Effects. 1823 in England [Philadelphia 1834] [British Library 001023068] 
 Observations on the Applicability of the Pacifist Principles of the New Testament on the Conduct of States, and on the Limitations which those principles impose on the Rights of Self-defence. London Peace Society Tract No. VII, 1825 [British Library #001023074] 
 Essays on the Principles of Morality, and on the Private and Political Rights and Obligations of Mankind. In two volumes, Hamilton, Adams & Co, 1829 [British Library #001023056] 
 Memoir, letters and poems of Jonathan Dymond : with bibliographical supplements: Charles William Dymond: privately printed, Bristol, 1911 [British Library # 007585688]

Views

In his works Dymond extended the pacifist argument against war beyond the purely Christian insight of earlier generations of Quakers to wider more rationalist arguments, as in this against the notion of a distinction between aggressive and defensive war from the Inquiry:

Dymond was a fervent antimilitarist. He saw armies as enemies of liberty and physical and moral subjection as a necessary condition of army life. The opinion he voiced prefigures some of the later objections to conscription made by Quakers and other conscientious objectors.

See also
 Quaker history
 Quakers
 Quakers in Britain
 Pacifism
 Peace education
 Peace Society
 Peace Testimony

References

Further reading
 Leslie Stephen, 'Dymond, Jonathan (1796–1828)', rev. K. D. Reynolds, Oxford Dictionary of National Biography, Oxford University Press, 2004 accessed 25 July 2012

External links
 
 Jonathan Dymond Essays on the principles of morality & on the private & political rights & obligations of mankind (1896) Full text at Internet Archive
 Jonathan Dymond Judicial oaths : their moral character and effects (1889) Full text at Internet Archive

1796 births
1828 deaths
18th-century Quakers
Christian ethicists
English Christian pacifists
English male non-fiction writers
English philosophers
English Quakers
Non-interventionism